The 914th Aircraft Control and Warning Squadron is an inactive United States Air Force unit. It was last assigned to the Duluth Air Defense Sector, Air Defense Command, stationed at Armstrong Air Station, Ontario, Canada. It was inactivated on 1 November 1962.

The unit was a General Surveillance Radar squadron providing for the air defense of North America.

Lineage
 Constituted as the 914th Aircraft Control and Warning Squadron
 Activated on 10 March 1952
 Discontinued on 1 November 1962

Assignments
 29th Air Division, 10 March 1952
 30th Air Division, 21 December 1952
 4708th Defense Wing, 16 February 1953
 37th Air Division, 8 July 1956
 30th Air Division, 1 April 1959
 Duluth Air Defense Sector, 15 November 1959 - 1 November 1962

Stations
 Grenier AFB, New Hampshire, 10 March 1952
 Armstrong Air Station, Ontario, Canada, 21 December 1952 - 1 November 1962

References

 Cornett, Lloyd H. and Johnson, Mildred W., A Handbook of Aerospace Defense Organization  1946 - 1980,  Office of History, Aerospace Defense Center, Peterson AFB, CO (1980).

External links

Radar squadrons of the United States Air Force
Aerospace Defense Command units
1952 establishments in New Hampshire
1962 disestablishments in Ontario